Events from the year 1502 in art.

Events
The Worshipful Company of Painter-Stainers is formed by merger as a Livery Company of the City of London.

Works

 Vittore Carpaccio – St. Augustine in His Study
 Albrecht Dürer – Young Hare
 Andrea Mantegna – Triumph of the Virtues
 Raphael – Portrait of a Man
 Michael Sittow – "Vienna" portrait, probably of Catherine of Aragon (c.1502-4)

Births
 Pieter Coecke van Aelst, Flemish artist of paintings and tapestries (died 1550)
 Heinrich Aldegrever, German painter and engraver (died 1555/1561)
 Barthel Beham, German engraver, miniaturist and painter (died 1540)
 Wen Boren, Chinese landscape painter during the Ming Dynasty (died 1575)
 Luis de Vargas, Spanish painter of the late-Renaissance period (died 1568)
 Pier Francesco Foschi, Italian painter active in Florence in a Mannerist style (died 1567)
 Bartolomeo Veneto, Italian portrait painter (died 1546)

Deaths
 Francesco di Giorgio, Italian painter of the Sienese School, a sculptor, an architect and theorist, and a military engineer (born 1439)
 Dionisius, head of the Moscow school of icon painters (born 1440)
 Francesco Laurana, Dalmatian-born sculptor and medallist (born 1430)
 Alvise Vivarini, Italian painter (born 1446)
 1501/1502: Vittorio Crivelli, Italian painter (born 1440)
 1502/1503: Giovanni Donato da Montorfano, Italian painter (born 1460)

 
Years of the 16th century in art
1500s in art